Veysel is a Turkish given name for males. 

Veysel may refer to:

Places
Veysel, Emirdağ, village in the District of Emirdağ, Afyonkarahisar Province, Turkey

Persons
People named Veysel include:
 Veysel Aksu (born 1985), Turkish footballer
 Veysel Cihan, Turkish footballer
 Veysel Eroğlu, Turkish politician
 Veysel Özgür (1877-1931), officer of the Ottoman Army and the Turkish Army
 Veysel Sarı, Turkish footballer
 Veysel Turan (1901-2007),  one of the last Turkish veterans of the Turkish War of Independence (1919-1923)

Turkish masculine given names